The genre of science fiction has been prevalent in the Indian film industry since the second half of the 20th century. Beginning in 1952, the Tamil film Kaadu was made, which was an Indian-American co-production. The 1963 Tamil film Kalai Arasi, 1965 Telugu film Dorikithe Dongalu, and 1967 Hindi film Chand Par Chadayee also have science fiction in their storyline. The Alien was a science fiction film under production in the late 1960s which was eventually cancelled. The film was being directed by Bengali Indian director Satyajit Ray and produced by Hollywood studio Columbia Pictures. The script was written by Ray in 1967, based on "Bankubabur Bandhu", a Bengali story he had written in 1962 for Sandesh, the Ray family magazine.

In 1987, the superhero film Mr. India was a huge success which strengthened the hold of sci-fi films in India, especially Hindi cinema. Indiatimes Movies ranks the movie amongst the Top 25 Must See Bollywood Films. Mr. India brought the idea of science fiction to the general people in India. The 1991 Telugu film Aditya 369 was the first time travel film made in India. The film explored dystopian and post-apocalyptic themes in a satirical manner. It was a critical and commercial success and is considered a landmark film in the science fiction genre in Indian cinema. In 2003, the blockbuster film Koi... Mil Gaya marked the beginning of the successful Krrish, which is the first sci-fi/superhero film series in Indian cinema. The 2018 Tamil film 2.0 starring Rajinikanth, Akshay Kumar and Amy Jackson is one of the most expensive and the most successful sci/fi film ever produced in India.

List of films

The following list contains the names of the Indian science fiction films released since 1952. Early 21st century has seen the release of more than 30 such films, compared to the previous 14, there is less info about it now they Indian film classics.

Space Opera films
The following are the list of space opera science fiction films.

Others

See also
Cinema of India
Bengali science fiction

References

 
Science and technology in India